Peptoclostridium acidaminophilum is a Gram-positive bacterium species in the family Peptostreptococcaceae, notable for being an amino acid-degrading obligate anaerobe producing or utilizing H2 or formate. It is rod-shaped and motile by a polar to subpolar flagellum. Its type strain is al-2. It produces several relevant enzymes.

References

Further reading

External links 
LPSN

Type strain of Eubacterium acidaminophilum at BacDive -  the Bacterial Diversity Metadatabase

Bacteria described in 1989
Peptostreptococcaceae